Gundam Gaiden III is a video game developed and published by Bandai for the Sega Saturn.

Gameplay
Gundam Gaiden III is the final part of the trilogy, and follows the player's advancement in the Mobile Suit Corps.

Reception
Next Generation reviewed the Saturn version of the game, rating it one star out of five, and stated that "Although marketed as a separate game in Japan, this is nothing more than a glorified expansion pack – and a poor one at that.  This is the kind of game that makes you glad the Sega-Bandai merger fell through."

References

1997 video games
First-person shooters
Gundam video games
Japan-exclusive video games
Sega Saturn games
Sega Saturn-only games
Video games developed in Japan